Lotru Mountains are a group of mountains that are part of the  Southern Carpathians, in Romania.

References

External links
 
 
 

Mountain ranges of Romania
Mountain ranges of the Southern Carpathians
Geography of Vâlcea County